Herston busway station is located in Brisbane, Australia serving the suburb of Herston. It opened on 14 December 2005 as RCH Herston on an existing section of the Inner Northern Busway. It was the northernmost station until the busway was extended to RBWH on 3 August 2009.

The design of the station is very similar to QUT Kelvin Grove station and features golf ball protection screens due to the close proximity to Victoria Park Golf Course.

The station was renamed on 29 November 2014 from RCH Herston, with the RCH dropped after the Royal Children's Hospital closed and was relocated to the Queensland Children's Hospital in South Brisbane.

It is served by four routes all operated by Brisbane Transport.

References

External links

[ Herston station] TransLink

Bus stations in Brisbane
Herston, Queensland
Transport infrastructure completed in 2005